The 2021–22 season was the 114th season in the existence of R.S.C. Anderlecht and the club's 86th consecutive season in the top flight of Belgian football. In addition to the domestic league, Anderlecht participated in this season's edition of the Belgian Cup and the UEFA Europa Conference League.

Players

First-team squad

Other players under contract

Out on loan

Transfers

In

Out

Pre-season and friendlies

Competitions

Overall record

First Division A

League table

Results summary

Results by round

Matches
The league fixtures were announced on 8 June 2021.

Play-Off I

Results summary

Results by round

Matches

Belgian Cup

Anderlecht entered the competition in the sixth round. They were drawn away to RAAL La Louvière in the sixth round and Seraing in the seventh round.

UEFA Europa Conference League

Third qualifying round
The draw for the third qualifying round was held on 19 July 2021.

Play-off round
The draw for the play-off round was held on 2 August 2021.

Statistics

Appearances and goals
Source:
Numbers in parentheses denote appearances as substitute.
Players with names struck through and marked  left the club during the playing season.
Players with names in italics and marked * were on loan from another club for the whole of their season with Anderlecht.
Players listed with no appearances have been in the matchday squad but only as unused substitutes.
Key to positions: GK – Goalkeeper; DF – Defender; MF – Midfielder; FW – Forward

Squad appearances and goals
Last updated 30 November 2021

|-
! colspan=14 style=background:#dcdcdc; text-align:center|Goalkeepers

|-
! colspan=14 style=background:#dcdcdc; text-align:center|Defenders

|-
! colspan=14 style=background:#dcdcdc; text-align:center|Midfielders

|-
! colspan=14 style=background:#dcdcdc; text-align:center|Forwards

|-
! colspan=14 style=background:#dcdcdc; text-align:center|Players who have made an appearance this season but have left the club

|}

Goalscorers

References

R.S.C. Anderlecht seasons
Anderlecht
2021–22 UEFA Europa Conference League participants seasons